"Connect the Dots" is a song by American rock band New Found Glory, serving as a limited edition single from their first live album Kill It Live (2013). The single was released on September 10 via Violently Happy Records, a partnership between independent label Bridge Nine Records and the bands guitarist Chad Gilbert.

The single was announced in August and later released as a digital download on September 10, before a 7" vinyl limited to just 1,000 pressings across three variants on September 17. The single features title track "Connect the Dots" (one of three new studio recordings specifically for Kill It Live), as well as live recordings of "Truck Stop Blues" and "Better Off Dead", which were not included in the final cut of the full album. The band had performed two sold-out dates at the Chain Reaction music venue in Anaheim, California between March 27–28, 2013.

Track listing

Personnel
The following personnel contributed to Connect the Dots, as adapted from the single liner notes.
New Found Glory
 Jordan Pundik — lead vocals
 Chad Gilbert — lead guitar, backing vocals
 Steve Klein — rhythm guitar
 Ian Grushka — bass guitar
 Cyrus Bolooki — drums, percussion

Production
 Paul Miner — producer, recording, engineering
 Kyle Black — mixing
 Mike Piacentini — mastering
 Kyle Crawford — art direction
 Chris Wrenn — design
 John Weiner — photography

Release history

References

2013 singles
New Found Glory songs
Songs written by Jordan Pundik
Songs written by Chad Gilbert
Songs written by Steve Klein (musician)
Songs written by Ian Grushka
Songs written by Cyrus Bolooki
Song recordings produced by Chad Gilbert